Cottonwood Point is a census-designated place in Pemiscot County, in the U.S. state of Missouri.

History
A post office called Cottonwood Point was established in 1853, and remained in operation until 1912. The community was named for a grove of cottonwood trees near the original town site.
It is also the home of the Historic Taylor Cemetery and the Taylor Cemetery Restoration Project started in 2017.

References

Census-designated places in Pemiscot County, Missouri